Loukrounou is an abandoned village in the Paphos District of Cyprus, located 3 km north of Miliou.

Topography  

Loukronou is located next to the Lake of Evretou, and it is easily reached in the direction of the villages, Miliou and Giolou. Loukrounou is situated 210 m above sea level.

Historical Population 
According to the census reports, Loukrounou was always solely inhabited by Turkish Cypriots. During the British period the population of the village fluctuated and eventually declined. The total number of inhabitants dropped from 67 in 1891 to 35 persons in 1960.

Naming 
Loukrounou is a small hamlet located ten kilometers south of Polis and two kilometers north of Miliou. The origin of the name is obscure. In 1958 Turkish Cypriots adopted the alternative name Olukönü, meaning “in front of the drain pipe.” It is difficult to understand why they chose this name.

References

Communities in Paphos District